Majed Suroor (Arabic: ماجد سرور) (born 14 October 1997) is an Emirati association football player who plays for Al-Sharjah.

Honours
Sharjah
UAE Pro-League: 2018–19
UAE Super Cup: 2019

External links

References

Emirati footballers
1997 births
Living people
Sharjah FC players
UAE Pro League players
Association football defenders
Footballers at the 2018 Asian Games
Asian Games bronze medalists for the United Arab Emirates
Asian Games medalists in football
Medalists at the 2018 Asian Games